Robert Reid was a Scottish professional football forward who played in the Scottish League for Hibernian and Hamilton Academical.

Personal life 
Reid enlisted in the British Army during the First World War.

Career statistics

References

Year of birth missing
Scottish footballers
Scottish Football League players
Association football forwards
Hibernian F.C. players
Year of death missing
British Army personnel of World War I
Place of birth missing
Hamilton Academical F.C. players
British Army soldiers